The Sheikh Hamad Award for Translation and International Understanding is a Qatari literary award for translation from and to Arabic. The total value of the award is $2 million. It is named in honor of Hamad bin Khalifa Al Thani, the ruling Emir of Qatar from 1995 to 2013. It is among the world's richest literary prizes for translation.

History
Sheikh Hamad Award for Translation and International Understanding was initiated by the FAIR Forum (Forum for Arab and International Relations), in Doha, Qatar in 2015, in order to revive the culture of honoring translation and translators, which has been one of the pillars of Arab civilization throughout the ages. From Bayt Al-Hikma (The House of Wisdom) to Madrasat Al-Alsun (School of languages), translation played a major role in the exchanges between the Arab culture and the world throughout history. It enabled to convey thoughts and words and to build bridges between the two sides. Today, translation and translators still have an important role in promoting peace and harmony between different cultures.

The annual award consists of three categories:
 The Translation Awards: include four branches: from Arabic to English, from English to Arabic, from Arabic to a second language and from the second language to Arabic. Each branch is worth $200,000 ($100,000 first place, $60,000 second place and $40,000 third place). 
 The Achievement awards: up to ten branches: the translation from Arabic to 5 other languages and the translation from these 5 languages to Arabic. Each branch is worth up to $100,000.
 The International Understanding Award: worth $200,000 for a single winner, it aims at recognizing the efforts of an individual or institution in building a culture of peace and promoting international understanding.

2021 
The second language for the Translation Award was Chinese. The languages for the Achievement Awards category were Urdu, Amharic, Greek, and Dutch.

Translation Awards  

Achievement Awards

2017 
The second language for the Translation Award category was French. The languages for the Achievement Awards category are Japanese, Chinese, Persian, Urdu and Malay.

Source:

Translation Awards

Achievement Awards

2016 Edition 

The second language for 2016 was Spanish.

Source:

2015 Edition 

The second language for 2017 was Turkish.

Source:

References

External links
Sheikh Hamad Award for Translation and International Understanding

Qatari literary awards
Awards established in 2015
2015 establishments in Qatar
Translation awards
Arabic literary awards